Sándor Schwartz (18 January 1909 - 1994) was a Romanian football player, who participated in the 1934 FIFA World Cup for the Romania national football team.

Schwartz joined Ripensia Timişoara in 1930, and played for the club until the outbreak of World War II. He also made 10 appearances for Romania.

Honours
Ripensia Timișoara
Liga I (4): 1932–33, 1934–35, 1935–36, 1937–38
Cupa României (2): 1933–34, 1935–36

References

External links

1909 births
1994 deaths
Sportspeople from Târgu Mureș
People from the Kingdom of Hungary
Romanian footballers
Liga I players
CSM Unirea Alba Iulia players
Vagonul Arad players
CS Minerul Lupeni players
FC Ripensia Timișoara players
Szegedi AK players
Romania international footballers
Romanian expatriate footballers
Romanian expatriate sportspeople in Hungary
Expatriate footballers in Hungary
1934 FIFA World Cup players
Association football forwards